Hacine (previously Dublineau, ديبلينو Dīblīnū) is a town and commune in Mascara Province, Algeria. According to the 1998 census it has a population of 9,176. In 1994, an earthquake destroyed the village, along with two others, and killed 171 people.

References

Communes of Mascara Province
Mascara Province